The 1943–44 season was Galatasaray SK's 40th in existence and the club's 32nd consecutive season in the Istanbul Football League.

Squad statistics

Squad changes for the 1943–1944 season
In:

Istanbul Football League

Classification

Matches
Kick-off listed in local time (EEST)

Istanbul Futbol Kupası

3rd Round

1/4 final

1/2 final

Friendly matches

References
 Atabeyoğlu, Cem. 1453-1991 Türk Spor Tarihi Ansiklopedisi. page(155-159).(1991) An Grafik Basın Sanayi ve Ticaret AŞ
 Tekil, Süleyman. Dünden bugüne Galatasaray, (1983), page(88, 123-125, 184). Arset Matbaacılık Kol.Şti.
 Futbol vol.2. Galatasaray. Page: 565, 586. Tercüman Spor Ansiklopedisi. (1981)Tercüman Gazetecilik ve Matbaacılık AŞ.
 1940 Milli Küme Maçları. Türk Futbol Tarihi vol.1. page(81). (June 1992) Türkiye Futbol Federasyonu Yayınları.

External links
 Galatasaray Sports Club Official Website 
 Turkish Football Federation - Galatasaray A.Ş. 
 uefa.com - Galatasaray AŞ

Galatasaray S.K. (football) seasons
Turkish football clubs 1943–44 season
1940s in Istanbul